Yoakim Karchovski (c. 1750 - c. 1820), also known as Hadži Joakim, was a cleric, writer and one of the early figures of the Bulgarian National Revival. In his writings, he self identified as a Bulgarian and called his language Bulgarian. He is considered an ethnic Macedonian in North Macedonia. In May 2022 he was canonized by the Macedonian Orthodox Church as a saint.

Biography 
Karchovski was born around 1750. birthplace is unknown, although multiple theories exist. Not much is known about his life. Karchovski was most likely educated in Constantinople. 

In 1787 he began working as a priest. During most of his life he served in Kriva Palanka and the surrounding villages. He also worked in Kratovo, Debar, Štip, Samokov, Melnik and Kyustendil. 

He had 3 children. In around 1807 Karchovski became a monk. In 1814 he became a pilgrim and teacher and in 1819 he became a hieromonk. He died around 1820.

Works 

Karchovski authored 5 works printed in Buda:
Lecture spoken because of dying (Слово исказаное заради умирание; 1814)
Story about the terrible and second coming of Christ (Повест ради страшнаго и втораго пришествия Христова; 1814)
This book called suffering (Сия книга глаголемаа митарства; 1817)
The Wonders of the Holy Virgin (Чудеса пресвятия Богородици; 1817)
Some edifyingly advices (Различна поучителна наставления; 1819)

See also 

 Kiril Peychinovich
 Bulgarian National Revival
 Macedonian National Revival

References

18th-century Bulgarian people
19th-century Bulgarian people
Year of birth uncertain
1820 deaths
Christian writers
Bulgarian Christians
Bulgarian priests
Bulgarian writers
Bulgarian educators
Macedonian Bulgarians
19th-century Bulgarian writers
19th-century Bulgarian educators
18th-century Bulgarian writers
18th-century Bulgarian educators